Sir Robert John Thomas, 1st Baronet (23 April 1873 – 27 September 1951) was a Welsh businessman and Liberal Party politician, who was twice elected to Parliament.

Thomas was a ship and insurance broker. In 1918 he was created a Baronet, of Garreglwyd in the County of Anglesey.

Politics
He was elected at the 1918 general election as the Member of Parliament (MP) for the new constituency of Wrexham. Standing as a Liberal, with the official backing of the David Lloyd George led Coalition Government, he faced only a Labour Party opponent and won 76% of the votes.

At the 1922 general election he stood as a National Liberal Party candidate for Anglesey, losing by a margin of 9% to the sitting Labour MP Sir Owen Thomas. 

However, Owen Thomas died in January 1923, and at the resulting by-election in April Robert Thomas won a 3-way contest with 53% of the votes, and a 23% majority over the second-placed Labour candidate.

He was returned unopposed at the general election in December 1923. He was returned by a majority of 28% over his Labour opponent at the election in 1924. 

He stood down from Parliament at the 1929 general election.

Arms

References

Further reading
 Richards, Emlyn. Syr Robert John Thomas, y Garreglwyd (Sir Ifor Williams Memorial lecture.) Given in Anglesey, 31 October 1997

External links 
 

Liberal Party (UK) MPs for Welsh constituencies
1873 births
1951 deaths
Thomas, Robert, 1st Baronet
UK MPs 1918–1922
UK MPs 1923–1924
UK MPs 1924–1929
Welsh businesspeople in shipping
National Liberal Party (UK, 1922) politicians